Neslihan Okumus (born ) is a Turkish weightlifter, competing in the 63 kg category and representing Turkey at international competitions. 

She competed at the 2010 Summer Youth Olympics.
She competed at world championships, at the 2011 World Weightlifting Championships.

Major results

References

1994 births
Living people
Turkish female weightlifters
Place of birth missing (living people)
Weightlifters at the 2010 Summer Youth Olympics